The western slender bluetongue (Cyclodomorphus celatus) is a species of lizard in the family Scincidae. The species is endemic to the lower west coast and adjacent areas of Western Australia, including many offshore islands.

Reproduction
The spermatogenic activity of the Western slender bluetongue reaches a peak in October. Mating and fertilization also peak in October. Young are born in January after approximately three months of pregnancy.

References

Cyclodomorphus
Reptiles described in 1995
Skinks of Australia